Joshua Michael Tillman (born May 3, 1981), better known by his stage name Father John Misty, is an American musician, singer, songwriter, and record producer. He has also performed and released studio albums under the name J. Tillman.

Maintaining a steady output of solo recordings since 2004, Tillman has been either a permanent or touring member of Demon Hunter, Saxon Shore, Fleet Foxes, Jeffertitti's Nile, Pearly Gate Music, Siberian, Har Mar Superstar, Poor Moon, Low Hums, and Jonathan Wilson, and has toured extensively with Damien Jurado, Jesse Sykes, and David Bazan. He has also made contributions to albums by more mainstream artists such as Beyoncé, Lady Gaga, Kid Cudi, and Post Malone.

Early life
Joshua Michael Tillman was born in Rockville, Maryland, on May 3, 1981, the son of evangelical Christian parents Barbara and Irvin C. Tillman, an engineer at Hewlett-Packard, who met at a Christian youth group. His mother was raised in Ethiopia, where her parents were missionaries. The eldest of four children, he has a brother and two sisters. Before he settled on a career as a musician, he briefly had ambitions of becoming a pastor because of the performance aspect when he was approximately six years old. He has commented that his parents strongly emphasized Christianity in his upbringing, to a degree which he has described as "culturally oppressive". He was estranged from his parents for many years, but they have since reconciled.

After learning drums at a young age, Tillman learned guitar when he was 12. He attended a Baptist church and an Episcopal elementary school while growing up, then a Pentecostal Messianic day school. He said he was naïve when he was growing up because there was limited secular cultural influence within the home and no secular music was allowed. Around the age of 17, his parents modified their cultural stipulations; he was allowed to listen to secular music that had a "spiritual theme". For this reason, his early purchases included albums like Bob Dylan's Slow Train Coming as he was able to convince his parents that Dylan was classified as a "Christian artist".

Career

Early career and Fleet Foxes (2004–2012)
After attending Nyack College in New York from 1999–2002, Tillman moved to Seattle when he was 21. He found a job there working at a bakery, which allowed him to record at night before his 4:30 am shift began. A demo he made eventually found its way to Seattle singer and songwriter Damien Jurado. A year later, Tillman started opening for Jurado. At shows Tillman would distribute CD-R copies of songs that would later become his album I Will Return. During the tour, he also struck up a friendship with Eric Fisher, who produced another CD-R album, Long May You Run. Both albums were later released on Keep Recordings. Tillman and Jurado both later signed on for a U.S. tour with Richard Buckner.

In 2006, the independent label Fargo Records released Tillman's first properly distributed solo album, Minor Works, and reissued I Will Return and Long May You Run as a two-disc set the same year. In 2007, Yer Bird Records released his more elaborately arranged fourth album, Cancer and Delirium.

After signing to independent record label Western Vinyl, Tillman released two albums in 2009, Vacilando Territory Blues and Year in the Kingdom. Tillman said he wrote the title track of Vacilando Territory Blues to describe imagery he associates with his move to Seattle. His brother Zach subsequently moved there as well and is now in the musical group Pearly Gate Music. The following year Tillman released Singing Ax.

In 2008, Tillman joined Seattle folk rock band Fleet Foxes as their drummer. After extensive touring with Fleet Foxes, promoting their album Helplessness Blues, Tillman played his final show with the band in Tokyo on January 20, 2012.

Father John Misty performing name and Fear Fun (2012–2014)

After leaving Fleet Foxes, Tillman moved to Los Angeles and signed to new label Sub Pop. Dissatisfied with the slow and sad music he had previously made, he adopted the new performing name of Father John Misty. The first album under his new name, Fear Fun, was released on May 1, 2012. A couple of months prior to the release of the album a video was released for the song "Hollywood Forever Cemetery Sings" starring Parks and Recreations Aubrey Plaza. The album was a dramatic departure from any of Tillman's prior releases.

As Father John Misty, Tillman was featured on Kid Cudi's 2013 album Indicud. Tillman wrote an essay about Damien Jurado's recording, Brothers and Sisters of the Eternal Son (Secretly Canadian, 2014). He also wrote the soundtrack for a short film called The History of Caves, directed by his wife, filmmaker Emma Elizabeth Tillman.

The "Limited Run Promotional Poster" was available at the artist's website, and promoted a purported release called New Winter, described as a "Christmas Neu-Jazz Double Album", and quoted several paradoxes and reviews (for example, from The Wall Street Journal, calling it the "new standard by which all seasonal music must now be measured", or from Spin, giving the release 10 out of 10 points and calling it "[e]ssential year-round listening"). The poster text further states that the release will be sold as "compact disc" as well as "[l]imited edition prismatic hologram 6xLP on merlot and emerald semi-translucent 180 gram vinyl with original alternate-side etchings by Josh Tillman available till[sic] supplies last". The poster names five songs that are part of the track list: "Gesture I: Inoculation (Mother And Child)", "Gesture II: Feast Of Spirits", "Anacrusis Future Seed", "Naked Fire/The Fifth Season" and "Gemini".

I Love You Honeybear (2015–2016)

The album I Love You, Honeybear was released in February 2015 to widespread acclaim. According to Tillman, it is a concept album about himself and his personal life. Tillman made headlines by covering Taylor Swift's "Blank Space" and "Welcome to New York" in 2015. He claimed to have never listened to the artist prior to recording the covers. This was done as a parody of Ryan Adams, who had released his own version of Swift's 1989, featuring covers of every song. Tillman released a new song entitled "Real Love Baby" on May 19, 2016. He appeared on the song "Saturday Night Inside Out" on The Avalanches' second studio album Wildflower, which was released on July 1, 2016.

Tillman gained media attention on July 22, 2016, after walking off stage at XPoNential Music Festival in Camden, New Jersey, after twenty minutes into his planned fifty-minute performance. Instead of performing his setlist, Tillman walked out and asked, "What the fuck is going on?" He then talked for six minutes about the "numbing" role entertainment plays in our lives and how "stupidity just fucking runs the world because entertainment is stupid." When the audience applauded him he asked them not to and responded by saying, "Maybe just take a moment to be really fucking profoundly sad." He finally played a thirteen-minute piece from his then-upcoming album Pure Comedy called "Leaving LA" which references the frustrations he spoke of during his speech. Tillman then covered Leonard Cohen's "Bird on the Wire" before telling the crowd he loved them and walked off the stage, cutting his performance short. The following day, Tillman explained his performance in an Instagram post, in which he called Donald Trump's speech at the 2016 Republican National Convention a "demonic clown pageant coronation of our next potential Idiot King", which took place the night before Tillman's performance.

In September 2016, his voice and likeness were featured in Brad Neely's animated surreal comedy show Harg Nallin' Sclopio Peepio on Adult Swim. In the first-season finale episode "For Alba", he sings a song titled "This is America". The song features an animated Father John Misty singing what appears to be a humorous parody of his music, with lyrics most likely written by Brad Neely. The lyrics describe how Americans "die doing the dumbest of crap," such as riding unicycles, ghost hunting, and performing stunts while cosplaying as Batman. He also obsessively mentions Go-Gurts throughout the song.

Pure Comedy and God's Favorite Customer (2017–2020)

On January 23, 2017, the title track from Misty's third studio album, Pure Comedy, was released with an accompanying music video. The second single released from Pure Comedy, "Two Wildly Different Perspectives", was released with another music video on January 30, 2017. The third single released was "Ballad of the Dying Man" on February 1, 2017. The fourth single, "Total Entertainment Forever", was released on the night it was performed on Saturday Night Live on March 4, 2017. Pure Comedy was released on April 7, 2017. The album sees Tillman externalize the stereotypical Father John Misty character that he developed through the two previous albums to prevent himself from being constricted to the character's image, using his personhood and experiences to expose his outlook on life.

The Pure Comedy World Tour began in April 2017 and continued into early 2018. During this tour, Tillman mixed the tracks for his next album produced with Jonathan Rado, revealing potential song titles "Mr. Tillman, Please Exit the Lobby" (later shortened to "Mr. Tillman"), "Ouch, I'm Drowning", "Well, We're Only People and There's Nothing Much We Can Do About It", and "Dum Dum Blues". The album explores heartache and was written during a six-week period where Tillman was living in a hotel. Tillman released the lead single, "Mr. Tillman", from God's Favorite Customer on February 20, 2018. The album was announced on April 18 and was released on June 1; its track listing was shared, alongside two further songs, "Disappointing Diamonds Are The Rarest Of Them All" and "Just Dumb Enough to Try".

British screenwriter and film producer Drew Pearce, who had previously directed the music video for "The Night Josh Tillman Came to Our Apartment", sought out Tillman for his directorial debut Hotel Artemis, when he wanted to cast a musician. Tillman has a small role in the film as a bank robber, and has said that his character "gets his head blown off within, like, 30 seconds." Tillman also contributed to the soundtrack of Hotel Artemis with the song "Gilded Cage", which was released on June 8, 2018, the same day as the film. The song has since been removed from streaming platforms for unknown reasons.

On March 23, 2020, Tillman released a live album titled Off-Key in Hamburg, which was recorded at the Hamburg Elbphilharmonie on August 8, 2019, on Bandcamp. All proceeds from the album go to the MusiCares COVID-19 Relief Fund. It has been described by NME as a "high-end luxury offering" and "immaculate".

Chloë and the Next 20th Century (2021–present) 
In December 2021, a spoken-word vinyl was mailed to fans by Bella Union. It was announced Father John Misty's fifth studio album, Chloë and the Next 20th Century, would be released on April 8, 2022, by Sub Pop and Bella Union. It includes eleven tracks produced by Tillman and Jonathan Wilson. The album and its track listing were officially revealed on January 5, 2022, with its lead single "Funny Girl" released the same day. A second single from the album, "Q4", was released on February 9, 2022. A third, "Goodbye Mr Blue", was released on March 9, 2022. On April 4, 2022, "The Next 20th Century" was released as the fourth and final single to precede the album's release. The Father John Misty EP Live at Electric Lady was released on Sub Pop on September 15, 2022. It includes a cover of Stevie Wonder's 
"I Believe (When I Fall in Love It Will Be Forever)". 

On January 13,  Lana Del Rey released the tracklist for her upcoming studio album Did You Know That There's a Tunnel Under Ocean Blvd; Tillman is featured on the twelfth track.

Musical style
Tillman's musical style has been described as indie rock, indie folk, folk rock, chamber pop, soft rock, psychedelic rock, folk, and country.

Tillman produced one album, Let Us Be, for Matthew Daniel Siskin, also known as Gambles.

Personal life
Tillman met photographer Emma Elizabeth Garr after he moved to the Laurel Canyon neighborhood of Los Angeles in 2011. They were married in Big Sur in September 2013. They lived in New Orleans, but have since returned to Los Angeles. Garr had previously lived in Seattle for several years. She has taken photographs for his albums.

Having been raised in an Evangelical Christian household, Tillman now openly criticizes religion in many of his songs. He has said that he is still "culturally Christian for all intents and purposes" but is troubled by the way Christianity is commonly expressed in the United States.

Tillman has struggled with depression, anxiety, and drug use. He stated in 2017 that he microdoses on LSD every day to alleviate his depression and anxiety. He has also stated that he has been diagnosed with PTSD by three separate therapists.

Discography

Studio albums

as J. Tillman
 Untitled No. 1 (2003)
 I Will Return (2004)
 Long May You Run, J. Tillman (2006)
 Minor Works (2006)
 Cancer and Delirium (2007)
 Vacilando Territory Blues (2009)
 Year in the Kingdom (2009)
 Singing Ax (2010)

as Father John Misty
 Fear Fun (2012)
 I Love You, Honeybear (2015)
 Pure Comedy (2017)
 God's Favorite Customer (2018)
 Chloë and the Next 20th Century (2022)

with Fleet Foxes
 Helplessness Blues (2011)

with Saxon Shore
 Be a Bright Blue (2002)
 Four Months of Darkness (2003)

Awards and nominations

A2IM Libera Awards

!
|-
| rowspan="2"|2015
| Himself
| Hardworking Artist of the Year
| 
| style="text-align:center;" rowspan="2"|
|-
| rowspan="2"|I Love You, Honeybear
| Album of the Year
| 
|-
| 2016
| rowspan="2"|Creative Packaging Award
| 
|
|-
| rowspan="3"|2018
| rowspan="2"|Pure Comedy
| 
| style="text-align:center;" rowspan="3"|
|-
| Album of the Year
| 
|-
| Himself
| Best Live Act 
|

Berlin Music Video Awards
The Berlin Music Video Awards (BMVAs) are an annual festival that puts filmmakers and the art behind music videos in the spotlight.

!
|-
| rowspan=2|2017
| rowspan=2|"Things It Would Have Been Helpful to Know Before the Revolution"
| Best Music Video 
| 
|-
| Best Director
|

Grammy Awards
The Grammy Awards are awarded annually by the National Academy of Recording Arts and Sciences of the United States. Josh has received one win from four nominations.

!
|-
| align="center" | 2012 
| Helplessness Blues 
| Best Folk Album
| 
| style="text-align:center;" rowspan="3"|
|-
| align="center" | 2016 
| I Love You, Honeybear (Limited Edition Deluxe Vinyl)
| Best Boxed or Special Limited Edition Package
| 
|-
| align="center" rowspan="2"| 2018 
| Pure Comedy
| Best Alternative Music Album
| 
|-
|  Pure Comedy (Deluxe Edition)
| Best Recording Package
| 
|

mtvU Woodie Awards

!
|-
| 2013
| "Hollywood Forever Cemetery Sings / Drive"
| Best Video Woodie
| 
|

NME Awards

!
|-
| 2018
| Himself
| Best International Solo Artist 
| 
|

Rober Awards Music poll

!
|-
| 2012
| rowspan=4|Himself
| Best Songwriter 
| 
|
|-
| rowspan=2|2015
| Best Male Artist 
| 
|
|-
| rowspan=2|Best Songwriter 
| 
|
|-
| 2017
| 
|

Sweden GAFFA Awards
Delivered since 2010, the GAFFA Awards (Swedish: GAFFA Priset) are a Swedish award that rewards popular music awarded by the magazine of the same name.

!
|-
| rowspan="2"| 2019
| Himself
| Best Foreign Solo Act
| 
| style="text-align:center;" rowspan="2"|
|-
| God's Favorite Customer
| Best International Album
| 
|-

UK Music Video Awards

The UK Music Video Awards is an annual award ceremony founded in 2008 to recognise creativity, technical excellence and innovation in music videos and moving images for music. Tillman has received one award from two nominations.

!
|-
| rowspan="2" | 2017
| rowspan="2" | "Things It Would Have Been Helpful to Know Before the Revolution"
| Best Rock/Indie Video – International
| 
|
|-
| Best Animation 
| 
|

References

External links
 
 Profile on Western Vinyl website
 Profile on Yer Bird website
 Profile on Autumn Tone Records website

Josh Tillman
1981 births
Living people
21st-century American drummers
21st-century American singers
American drummers
American male drummers
American male singer-songwriters
Bella Union artists
Critics of religions
Fleet Foxes members
Grammy Award winners
Indie folk musicians
Musicians from Seattle
Nyack College alumni
People from Rockville, Maryland
Singer-songwriters from Washington (state)
Third Man Records artists
Western Vinyl artists
People from Laurel Canyon, Los Angeles
Singer-songwriters from Maryland